The  Watan Party of Afghanistan (Hezeb-e Vâtân-e Afqanustan) is a social democratic political party in Afghanistan. The party describes itself as "national and democratic, progressive and reformist".

History 
The party was founded in exile during the time of the Taliban regime on 28 June 1997 in Munich, Germany, and has members inside the country where it is not officially registered. It considers itself a continuation of the leftist ideas of Mohammad Najibullah and his Democratic Watan Party of Afghanistan, which was established in 1990 as the successor to the ruling People's Democratic Party of Afghanistan (PDPA). The Munich conference elected Muhammad Isa Jassur as the leader of the party. The party held its second congress in Frankfurt/Main in 2000.

On 28 July 2017, thousands attended an event at a Kabul hotel for the fourth "consultative gathering for a legal relaunch of Watan Party". In the past, the party has attempted to register under the PDPA name, but has been refused registration.

See also 
 National United Party of Afghanistan

References

1997 establishments in Afghanistan
Democratic socialist parties in Asia
Left-wing nationalist parties
Nationalist parties in Asia
Political parties established in 1997
Political parties in Afghanistan
Progressive parties
Secularism in Afghanistan
Secularist organizations
Social democratic parties in Asia
Socialist organizations
Socialist parties in Afghanistan

ru:Национальная объединенная партия Афганистана